Isakova is a rural locality (a village) in Beloyevskoye Rural Settlement, Kudymkarsky District, Perm Krai, Russia. The population was 9 as of 2010.

Geography 
Isakova is located 29 km northwest of Kudymkar (the district's administrative centre) by road. Gordina is the nearest rural locality.

References 

Rural localities in Kudymkarsky District